Brotizolam (marketed under brand name Lendormin) is a sedative-hypnotic thienotriazolodiazepine drug which is a benzodiazepine analog. It possesses anxiolytic, anticonvulsant, hypnotic, sedative and skeletal muscle relaxant properties, and is considered to be similar in effect to other short-acting hypnotic benzodiazepines such as triazolam or midazolam. It is used in the short-term treatment of severe insomnia. Brotizolam is a highly potent and short-acting hypnotic, with a typical dose ranging from 0.125 to 0.25 milligrams, which is rapidly eliminated with an average half-life of 4.4 hours (range 3.6–7.9 hours).

It was patented in 1974 and came into medical use in 1984. Brotizolam is not approved for sale in the UK, United States or Canada. It is approved for sale in the Netherlands, Germany, Spain, Belgium, Luxembourg, Austria, Portugal, Israel, Italy, Taiwan and Japan.

Medical uses
Brotizolam is prescribed for the short-term treatment, 2–4 weeks only of severe or debilitating insomnia. Insomnia can be described as a difficulty falling asleep, frequent awakening, early awakenings or a combination of each. Brotizolam is a short-acting benzodiazepine and is sometimes used in patients who have difficulty in maintaining sleep or getting to sleep. Hypnotics should only be used on a short-term basis or in those with chronic insomnia on an occasional basis.

Brotizolam, in a dose of 0.25 mg can be used as a premedication prior to surgery, this dose was found to be comparable in efficacy to 2 mg flunitrazepam as a premedicant prior to surgery.

Side effects
Common side effects of brotizolam are typical of hypnotic benzodiazepines and are related to CNS depression, and include somnolence, ataxia, headache, anterograde amnesia, dizziness, fatigue, impairment of motor functions, slurred speech, confusion, and clumsiness.

Less common side effects include hypotension, respiratory depression, hallucinations, nausea and vomiting, palpitations, and paradoxical reactions (i.e. aggression, anxiety, violent behavior, etc.).

Brotizolam can cause residual side effects the next day such as impaired cognitive and motor functions as well as drowsiness. Disruption of sleep patterns may also occur such as suppression of REM sleep. These side effects are more likely at higher doses (above 0.5–1 mg).

In clinical trials brotizolam 0.125 to 0.5 mg improved sleep in insomniacs similarly to nitrazepam 2.5 and 5 mg, flunitrazepam 2 mg and triazolam 0.25 mg, whilst brotizolam 0.5 mg was shown to be superior to flurazepam 30 mg, but inferior to temazepam 30 mg in some studies. Brotizolam at dosages below 0.5 mg at night usually produced minimal morning drowsiness; no residual impairment of psychomotor performance occurs following dosages within the recommended range of 0.125 to 0.25 mg. No serious side effects have been reported to date and the most frequently observed adverse experiences are drowsiness, headache and dizziness. Mild rebound insomnia may occur in some patients when treatment is stopped.

Contraindications and special caution
Thienodiazepines and benzodiazepines require special precaution if used in the elderly, during pregnancy, in children, alcohol or drug-dependent individuals and individuals with comorbid psychiatric disorders.

Pharmacology
Brotizolam has been shown in animal studies to be a very high potency thienodiazepine. The elimination half-life of brotizolam is 3–6 hours. It is absorbed rapidly after administration; after administration, it is metabolized into active metabolites, one of which is far less potent than brotizolam and the other is only present in very small amounts in the blood and thus the metabolites of brotizolam do not have significant pharmacological effect in humans. Brotizolam induces impairment of motor function and has hypnotic properties.

Brotizolam increases the slow wave light sleep (SWLS) in a dose-dependent manner whilst suppressing deep sleep stages. Less time is spent in stages 3 and 4, which are the deep sleep stages, when GABAergics such as brotizolam are used. Benzodiazepines and thienodiazepines are therefore not ideal hypnotics in the treatment of insomnia. The suppression of deep sleep stages by either may be especially problematic to the elderly as they naturally spend less time in the deep sleep stage.

Abuse

Brotizolam is a drug with a potential for abuse. Drug misuse is defined as taking the drug to achieve a 'high', or continuing to take the drug in the long term against medical advice.

Abuse of brotizolam, although not widespread, was a problem in Hong Kong back in the late 1980s and 1990s. To control benzodiazepine abuse in Hong Kong, the Government's Pharmacy and Poisons Board reclassified benzodiazepines as Dangerous Drugs in October 1990. Apart from formal prescriptions, detailed records were then required for the supply and dispensing of these drugs. These regulations were applied initially only to brotizolam, triazolam and flunitrazepam as they were the major benzodiazepines of abuse. The impact of these regulatory changes on benzodiazepine use has been studied by analyzing the sales patterns of seven benzodiazepines between 1990–1993. In 1991, the sales of flunitrazepam and triazolam fell, but the sales of five unrestricted benzodiazepines increased. Particular problems arose with the trafficking and abuse of nimetazepam and the abuse of temazepam within that same year in 1991. The regulations that were originally only applied to brotizolam, triazolam and flunitrazepam were now being extended to include all benzodiazepines by January 1992. A regulation requiring the use of proper prescriptions and detailed records for the supply and dispensing of benzodiazepines, appears to have curbed, at least partially, their abuse in Hong Kong. There are still some problems with temazepam, nimetazepam, triazolam, and brotizolam, but they are not major.

Commercial names

See also 
Benzodiazepines
Thienodiazepines
Benzodiazepine dependence
Benzodiazepine withdrawal syndrome
Long-term effects of benzodiazepines
Midazolam
Triazolam
Loprazolam
Flubrotizolam
Fluclotizolam
Flurazepam
Responsible drug use, recreational drug use
GABA

References

Further reading

External links 
 Inchem.org - Brotizolam

Chlorobenzenes
GABAA receptor positive allosteric modulators
Bromoarenes
Thienotriazolodiazepines